Mangifera superba is a species of plant in the family Anacardiaceae. It is a tree endemic to Peninsular Malaysia.

References

superba
Endemic flora of Peninsular Malaysia
Trees of Peninsular Malaysia
Endangered plants
Taxonomy articles created by Polbot